The 2022-23 ISU Short Track Speed Skating World Cup is a multi-race tournament over a season for short track speed skating. The season began on 28 October 2022 in Canada and ended on 12 February 2023 in Netherlands. The World Cup is organised by the ISU who also runs world cups and championships in speed skating and figure skating.

The World Cup consisted of six competitions this year, with China organizing the third and fourth event originally but was forced to cancel due to international competitors' discontent with the closed loop system under the zero covid policy.

The six competitions have a single distance character across nine distances:

Men

 Individual: 500, 1000 and 1500 meters
 Team Relay: Men 5000 meters

Woman

 Individual: 500, 1000 and 1500 meters
 Team Relay: Women 3000 meters

Mixed

 Team Relay: Mixed Gender 2000 meters

Calendar

Men

Montreal 28-30 October 2022

Salt Lake City 4-6 November 2022

Almaty 9-11 December 2022

Almaty 16-18  December 2022

Dresden 3-5 February 2023

Dordrecht 10-12 February 2023

Women

Montreal 28-30 October 2022

Salt Lake City 4-6 November 2022

Almaty 9-11 December 2022

Almaty 16-18  December 2022

Dresden 3-5 February 2023

Dordrecht 10-12 February 2023

Mixed

Montreal 28-30 October 2022

Salt Lake City 4-6 November 2022

Almaty 9-11 December 2022

Almaty 16-18  December 2022

Dresden 3-5 February 2023

Dordrecht 10-12 February 2023

World Cup standings

Crystal Globe Awardees
 Men:  Park Ji-won
 Women:  Suzanne Schulting

Medal count

See also
 2023 Four Continents Short Track Speed Skating Championships
 2023 World Short Track Speed Skating Championships

References

Short track speed skating competitions
Speed skating in Canada
Speed skating in the Netherlands
2022 in short track speed skating